Yi Gwal's Rebellion was an armed rebellion in the Joseon dynasty led by General Yi Gwal, who helped Injo ascend to the throne and incited a rebellion against him for being rewarded poorly and trying to arrest his son. He led 12,000 of his soldiers to occupy Hanseong and replace him with Heungangun, his royal relative as king. But the Joseon army led by General Jang Man (张晚) retook the capital and crushed the rebellion, preserving King Injo's rule. 

Yi Gwal was subsequently executed by his own army. Yi Gwal's Rebellion weakened the Korean military, making them vulnerable to the Later Jin's invasion.

Background
Since the establishment of a Confucian dynasty by King Taejo, there had been political disputes between the parties in the government. Some disputes even resulted in bloodshed, like the one which occurred in the time of the king Yeonsangun. Also, during the time of King Seonjo just before the Japanese invasions of Korea, the political parties had been divided between East and West. The Eastern Party gradually split up into two parties called the Northern and Southern Parties.

Prelude
On April 11, 1623, the Western faction deposed Gwanghaegun in a coup. The coup directed by Kim Yu took place at night. Gwanghaegun fled but was captured later. The Western faction installed Neungyanggun as the sixteenth king Injo. Injo rewarded the major coup leaders with positions in the king's court.

In January 1624, Injo sent Yi Gwal to the Northern front as deputy commander of Yongbyon, Pyongyang, Pyongan Province, to fight against the expanding Jin dynasty. Yi Gwal also knew the importance of the new mission and was faithful to his duties, such as military training, maintenance of the castle wall, and strengthening the security of the camp.

The Western Party, recently unsatisfied with the success of Yi Gwal (who was part of the Northern Party), petitioned the king stating that Yi Gwal and some members of the Northern Party were planning a rebellion. Injo examined the petition as the ministers had a close relationship with the king. However, the reports proved false, and the Western Party failed to condemn Yi Gwal. The investigation made Yi Gwal feel like he was treated unfairly for his part in the Injo Coup. They tried again soon after, which provoked the suspicion of the king. However, Injo ignored the discussion about Yi Gwal but sent an examination and arrest party to Yongbyon to arrest Yi Gwal's son Yi Jeon and bring him to Hanyang. Yi Gwal suspected he would be condemned if his son confessed, he decided on a pre-emptive strike. Finally, he killed the arrest party, and the rebellion officially began on January 22, 1624.

Rebellion
Yi Gwal rescued Han Myeong-Ryun in the middle of the road, who was being transported to Seoul on charges of conspiracy, and joined the rebellion. Myeong-Ryun was a skilled operative, and from then on, the two formed a close relationship with each other and took command of the rebels. On January 22, Yi Gwal left Yongbyon with about 100 Hang-wae soldiers (Japanese who defected to Joseon during Japanese invasions of Korea) as his vanguard and 10,000 troops under his command. He evaded Pyongyang, where Do Won-su and Jang-man were stationed, and marched straight toward Seoul by a side road. At that time, Jang Man obtained information about Yi Gwal's rebellion, but his troops were only a few thousand, and he could not afford to fight head-on with Yi Gwal's elite army. The rebels of Yi Gwal went through Gaecheon and Jasan, were stationed in Sinchang, Gangdong, on the 26th, and changed their course to Sangwon on the 28th.

The first clash with the government troops happened in the Hamgyong province, where the government troops were being led by his close friends, Jeong Chung-sin and Nam Yi-hong. He tried to avoid these two generals and surpassed their troops. Yi Gwal first engaged the government forces at Shingyo in Hwangju and captured and killed the general, Park Yeong-Seo, and his officers. Yi Gwal's march was so fast that, in many cases, the military could not confirm his whereabouts. During the march to the capital, Yi Gwal defeated a regular army under the command of General Jang Man and surrounded Hanseong in what is known as the Battle of Jeotan. Yi Gwal then passed Gaeseong and surprise attacked the government forces guarding the Imjin river and defeated them. Injo protected by the Royal Guards Command (Eoyeongcheong), fled to Gongju, and Hanseong fell into the hands of the rebels on February 10, making it the first time a rebel army had captured the capital since the establishment of the Joseon dynasty.

On February 11, 1624, Yi Gwal enthroned Prince Heungan (興安君, 흥안군), son of King Seongjo as king and set up guards in Hanyang. At the same time, they established a new administrative system. Moreover, he put fliers all over the city so the people would support his troops. However, the rebel occupation of the capital did not last long. Hanseong was soon threatened by General Do Won-su, Jang Man, and other generals from the government forces and the provincial armies. General Jang Man returned with another regiment and reached the suburbs of Hanyang. After deliberation, they encamped at Gilmajae, which is advantageous in terms of topography. The next day, Yi Gwal learned of this movement and sent Han Myeong-Ryun to combat the enemy, he divided his army into two to surround and attack the government forces, but they lost the battle due to their inferior geographical position. As a result, Yi Gwal and Han Myeong-Ryun evacuated the capital with hundreds of rebels, escaped to Sugumun Gate, and fled to Gwangju via Samjeondo under cover of night. The Central Army recaptured the capital soon after. In pursuit of the government forces, the Yi Gwal ordered the rebel army to scatter. On the night of February 15, when they reached Mukbang-ri in Icheon, Yi Gwal and Han Myung-Ryun were murdered by their troops and generals led by Gi Ik-Heon, who were seeking forgiveness from the government, therefore, ending the rebellion.

Aftermath
News of Yi Gwal's death and others reached the residence of Gongju, and Injo returned on February 22. After Injo returned to Korea, he rewarded 32 people, including Jang Man, Jeong Chung-sin, and Nam Yi-Heung, who contributed to the rebellion of Yi Gwal as Jinmu Gong-sin (振武功臣), and prepared a plan to rectify the rebellion. However, Yi Gwa's rebellion considerably impacted the domestic and international situation at the time. On the inside, it was the first time the king had left Seoul due to a domestic rebellion, and it shocked the ruling class and the general public.

After the rebellion, Injo established two military camps, the Command of the Northern Approaches (Chongyungcheong), and the Royal Defense Command (Sueocheong). The Royal Guards Command had 260 artillery troops to defend the city walls of Hanseong and suppress rebellions. It grew to 7,000 troops after the Qing invasion, and during Hyojong's reign, 21,000 troops. The Command of the Northern Approaches defended the northern outskirts of Hanseong through the Bukhansanseong Fortress with 23,500 soldiers. The Royal Defense Command defended to defend south of Hanseong through Namhanseong Fortress with 16,500 troops.

Even though Injo was able to keep his throne, Joseon society effectively entered a period of chaos, and the rebellion displayed the weaknesses of royal authority while asserting the superiority of the aristocrats, who had gained even more power by fighting against the rebellion. Public sentiment was not stable for a long time due to the strengthening of temples by the ruling class. When the rebellion failed, Han Myung-Ryun's son Yun and others fled to the Jin dynasty, announcing the unstable situation in the country and encouraging them to invade the south, which provoked and facilitated the First Manchu invasion of Korea in 1627. The economy, which was experiencing a slight recovery from Gwanghaegun's reconstruction, was again ruined, and Korea would remain in a poor economic state for a few centuries.

See also
 Yi Gwal
 Injo of Joseon
 Later Jin invasion of Joseon

References

Conflicts in 1624
Joseon dynasty
Rebellions in Asia
17th-century revolutions
Protests in Korea